Sandomierz Synagogue is an inactive synagogue in Sandomierz, Poland. It was built in 1768 of brick in the Polish Baroque style, after the old synagogue burned down again for the last time in 1758. The new synagogue, used for nearly two centuries before the Holocaust exists until today. It was renovated several times in its history, notably in 1872, 1911 and 1929. The synagogue was devastated by the Germans during World War II. Since the renovation in the 1970s the building has been used as a State Archive.

Notes and references 

Baroque synagogues in Poland
20th-century attacks on synagogues and Jewish communal organizations
Former synagogues in Poland
18th-century synagogues
Synagogue Sandomierz
Buildings and structures in Świętokrzyskie Voivodeship
Holocaust locations in Poland